During World War II, the United States Army Air Forces (USAAF) established numerous airfields in Florida for antisubmarine defense in the western Atlantic and Gulf of Mexico and for training pilots and aircrews of USAAF fighters, attack planes, and light and medium bombers.
After early 1944, heavy bomber crews also trained in the State. However two major operations in Florida were the School of Applied Tactics and the air Proving Grounds which tested and developed new capabilities.

Most of these airfields were under the command of Third Air Force, the AAF Antisubmarine Command (AAFAC), or the Army Air Forces Training Command (AAFTC), the latter being the predecessor of the current-day United States Air Force's Air Education and Training Command (AETC).  The 26th Antisubmarine Wing was headquartered in Miami. It controlled about forty percent of the AAFAC squadrons.

However the other USAAF support commands, Air Technical Service Command (ATSC) and Air Transport Command (ATC) or Troop Carrier Command, also commanded a significant number of airfields in a support roles.

It is still possible to find remnants of these wartime airfields as most were converted into municipal airports, while others transitioned to the newly established United States Air Force in 1947.  

Two remained as active USAF installations until 1960 and a third until 1962, at which time they, too, were converted into purely civilian airports, the latter as a commercial airport.  

A fourth became a joint civil-military commercial airport hosting a Florida Air National Guard fighter-interceptor group until 1968 when the airport was permanently closed and replaced by a newly constructed international airport and concurrently constructed Air National Guard base also hosting the same Air National Guard fighter-interceptor group which today is a full fighter wing.  

A fifth airfield remained as an active Strategic Air Command (SAC) bomber, tanker and reconnaissance base with a tenant Aerospace Defense Command (ADC) air command and control squadron.  The base later incorporating a commercial jetport and became a joint civil-military airport in 1962 until the closure of the USAF installation in 1975 and its conversion to a civilian commercial international airport in 1976.  

A sixth airfield remained as an active Tactical Air Command (TAC), then Air Combat Command (ACC), fighter base until 1995, hosting an active ACC fighter wing, a collocated Air Force Reserve (AFRES) fighter wing, a collocated AFRES rescue squadron, and a TAC-gained Florida Air National Guard (FLANG) fighter alert detachment/operating location.  Having been substantially damaged by Hurricane Andrew in 1992, it was converted to air reserve base status as a fighter base for the extant Air Force Reserve Command (AFRC) fighter wing and a fighter alert detachment site for the FLANG.  

The remaining airfields that transitioned from USAAF to USAF continue to function as modern day active U.S. Air Force installations under the operational control of Air Force Special Operations Command (AFSOC), Air Force Materiel Command (AFMC), Air Combat Command (ACC) and Air Mobility Command (AMC).  In addition, a former World War II-era naval air station was transferred to USAF in the 1950s and remains under the control of the Air Force Space Command (AFSPC) with a tenant ACC-gained AFRC rescue wing assigned as its sole military flying unit.  An Air Education and Training Command (AETC) flying training group is also a tenant command on another active naval air station.  

At the former USAAF and USAAF-cum-USAF airfields, hundreds of the temporary buildings that were used also survive today, with some still used for aeronautical activities and others being used for a variety of other purposes.

Major Airfields

Multiple Commands
 I Bomber Command  (1941)
 Transferred to: Army Air Forces Antisubmarine Command (1942-1943)
 26th Antisubmarine Wing (Squadrons)
 Transferred to: III Bomber Command
 Became sub-base of: MacDill Field (1943)
 Became sub-base of: Chatam Army Airfield, Georgia (1943-1944)
 Transferred to: Air Service Command (1944-1945)
 Later: Imeson Field Airport (1947-1968)
 Concurrent Use:  125th Fighter-Interceptor Group, Florida Air National Guard, (1947-1968)
 Now: Imeson Industrial Park (airfield closed; flight operations relocated to Jacksonville International Airport)

Third Air Force

 HQ Third Air Force; III Fighter Command
 Also used by: Army Air Forces Antisubmarine Command (1942-1943)
 26th Antisubmarine Wing (Squadrons)
 337th Fighter Group (Single Engine)
 22d Bombardment Training Wing (Heavy)
 Drew Field Replacement Training Unit (Heavy Bombardment)
 Army Air Force Aircraft Warning Unit Training Center (315th AAFBU)
 89th Combat Crew Training Wing
 Known sub-bases and auxiliaries
 Bartow Army Airfield
 Brooksville Army Airfield
 Hillsborough Army Airfield
 Now: Tampa International Airport 
 HO III Bomber Command
 27th Air Base Group
 55th Bombardment Training Wing (Heavy)
 326th Army Air Force Base Unit
 Also used by: Air Transport Command
 Known sub-bases and auxiliaries
 Bonita Springs Auxiliary Field
 Brooksville Army Airfield
 Hillsborough Army Airfield
 Fort Myers Army Airfield
 Lakeland Army Airfield
 Now:  MacDill Air Force Base 
 Initially Sub-Base of MacDill Field
 III Bomber Command
 88th Bombardment Group (Heavy)
 Avon Park Replacement Training Unit (Heavy Bombardment)
 Later: Avon Park Air Force Base (1949-1956)
 Now:  Avon Park Air Force Range and MacDill AFB Auxiliary Field 
 Initially Sub-Base of MacDill Field (Drane Field)
 III Bomber Command
 60th Flying Training Detachment (Medium Bombardment)
 Transferred to: III Fighter Command (1943)
 Commando Squadron Fighter Training School
 Now: Lakeland Linder International Airport (1960-Present) 
 III Fighter Command
 Initially Sub Base of Sarasota Army Airfield
 Pinellas Replacement Training Unit (Fighter, Single Engine)
 Now: St. Petersburg-Clearwater International Airport 
 Concurrent Use:  Coast Guard Air Station Clearwater and Army Reserve Army Aviation Support Facility

 III Fighter Command
 338th Fighter Group  (Single Engine)
 Dale Mabry Replacement Depot
 335th Army Air Force Base Unit (Replacement, Fighter)
 Known sub-bases and auxiliaries
 Thomasville Army Airfield (Georgia)
 Harris Neck Army Airfield (Georgia)
 Perry Army Airfield
 Carrabelle Flight Strip#2
 Later: Dale Mabry Field (commercial airport) (1946-1961)
 Now: Campus of Tallahassee Community College (airfield closed)
 III Fighter Command
 54th Fighter Group  (Single Engine)
 Bartow Replacement Unit (Fighter, Single-Engine)
 Later:  Bartow Air Base (1950-1961)
 Now: Bartow Municipal Airport 
 III Bomber Command
 Later: III Fighter Command
 337th Fighter Group  (Single Engine)
 Sarasota Replacement Training Unit (Fighter, Single Engine)
 Known sub-bases and auxiliaries
 Fort Myers Army Airfield
 Lake Wales Army Airfield
 Pinellas Army Airfield
 Punta Gorda Army Airfield
 Immokalee Army Airfield
 Now: Sarasota-Bradenton International Airport 
 III Fighter Command
 Also used by 27th Service Group (Air Service Command)
 53d Fighter Group  (Single Engine)
 Venice Replacement Training Unit (Fighter, Single Engine)
 422d Army Air Force Base Unit
 Now: Venice Municipal Airport

AAF Training Command
Eastern Flying Training Command

 17th Single Engine Flying Training Group (Advanced-Single Engine)
 325th Army Air Force Base Unit
 Known sub-bases and auxiliaries
 Ellis Auxiliary Field
 Malone Auxiliary Field
 Bascom Auxiliary Field
 Alliance Auxiliary Field
 Later:  Graham Air Base  (1951-1960)
 Now: Marianna Municipal Airport 
 Specialized Pilot Training School (Four Engine)
 76th Army Air Force Base Unit
 Known sub-bases and auxiliaries
 Conners Auxiliary Field
 Immokalee Army Airfield
 Now: Sebring Regional Airport 

 Army Air Forces Flexible Gunnery School
 38th Flexible Gunnery Training Group
 328th Army Air Force Base Unit
 Known sub-bases and auxiliaries
 Naples Army Airfield
 Now: Buckingham Field Airport 
 Army Air Forces Flexible Gunnery School
 38th Flexible Gunnery Training Group
 69th Army Air Force Base Unit
 Known sub-bases and auxiliaries
 Apalachicola Army Airfield
 Now:  Tyndall Air Force Base 

Eastern Technical Training Command'
 3501st Army Air Force Base Unit (Technical School, Radar)
 Airfield became: Boca Raton Airport 
 Station became: Florida Atlantic University

AAF Contract Flying Schools

 Lodwick Aviation Military Academy
 61st Army Air Force Fight Training Detachment (Contract Flying)
 Known sub-bases and auxiliaries
 Avon Park Auxiliary Field#1
 Avon Park Auxiliary Field#2
 Avon Park Auxiliary Field#3
 Avon Park Auxiliary Field#4
 Now: Avon Park Executive Airport 
 Lodwick Aviation Military Academy
 60th Flying Training Detachment (Contract Pilot School)
 Also: Royal Air Force training
 Known sub-bases and auxiliaries
 Coronet Auxiliary Field
 Haldeman-Elder Auxiliary Field
 Hampton Auxiliary Field
 Lodwick Auxiliary Field
 Northeast Auxiliary Field#1
 Northwest Auxiliary Field#3
 Gilbert Auxiliary Field
 Now: Closed 1957, currently recreation area
 Riddle-McKay Aero College
 75th Flying Training Detachment (Contract Pilot School)
 Also: Royal Air Force training
 Now: Airglades Airport 
 Greenville Aviation School
 Also operated: AAFSAT Ocala Bombing Range
 Now: Closed 1962, currently industrial park

 Riddle Aeronautical Institute
 53d Flying Training Detachment (Contract Pilot School)
 2148th Army Air Force Base Unit (Contract Pilot School)
 Also: Royal Air Force training
 Known sub-bases and auxiliaries
 Arcadia Airport
 Myrtle Auxiliary Field
 Southwest Auxiliary Field
 Sparkman Auxiliary Field
 Wells Auxiliary Field
 Now: Closed 1945, currently Desoto County Juvenile Correctional Complex
 Riddle Aeronautical Institute
 54th Flying Training Detachment]] (Contract Pilot School)
 2148th Army Air Force Base Unit]] (Contract Pilot School)
 Also: Royal Air Force training
 Known sub-bases and auxiliaries
 Dorr Auxiliary Field#1
 Dorr Auxiliary Field#2
 Dorr Auxiliary Field#3
 Dorr Auxiliary Field#4
 Now: Closed 1945, currently Desoto County Correctional Institution
 Civil, AAF, Navy training usage
 Riddle Aeronautical Institute
 Now: Closed 1947, partly Chapman Field Subtropical Horticulture Research Station

Army Air Forces School of Applied Tactics

 Initially used by: I Bomber Command (1941-1942)
 Initially used by: Army Air Forces Antisubmarine Command
 13th Bombardment Group (1942-1943)
 HQ Army Air Forces School of Applied Tactics (1942)
 9th Bombardment Group (Heavy)
 50th Fighter Group (Special)
 HQ Army Air Force Interceptor Command School (1943)
 481st Night Fighter Operational Training Group
 Known sub-bases and auxiliaries
 Brooksville Army Airfield
 Bushnell Army Airfield
 Kissimmee Army Airfield
 Cross City Army Airfield (1942-1946);  Cross City Air Force Station (1958-1970)
 Zephyrhills Army Airfield
 Airfield became: Orlando Municipal Airport (1946)
 Now: Orlando Executive Airport  
 Ground Station became:  Orlando Air Force Base (1947-1967)
 Ground Station transferred to: United States Navy as Naval Training Center Orlando (1968-1999)
 Now: Baldwin Park neighborhood of Orlando
 sub-base of Orlando Army Airbase (1942-1945)
 AAFSAT Technical Center
 Transferred to: Air Proving Ground Command (1945)
 Later:  Pinecastle Air Force Base (1951-1958);  McCoy Air Force Base (1958-1975)
 Now: Orlando International Airport 

 sub-base of Orlando Army Airbase (1942-1943)
 AAFSAT Medium Bombardment training unit
 415th Bombardment Group (Medium)
 Transferred to: III Fighter Command (1943)
 Commando Squadron Fighter Training School
 Known sub-bases and auxiliaries
 Cross City Army Airfield
 Keystone Army Airfield
 Leesburg Army Airfield
 Montbrook Army Airfield
 Now: Gainesville Regional Airport 
 sub-base of Orlando Army Airbase (1942-1944)
 AAFSAT Night Fighter Department (Dark)
 420th Night Fighter Squadron
 Transferred to: III Fighter Command (1944)
 Commando Troop Carrier Training School
 Known sub-bases and auxiliaries
 Canal Auxiliary Field
 Now: Dunnellon/Marion County Airport

Air Transport Command

 Station 8, Caribbean Wing, ATC
 563d Army Air Force Base Unit
 Was: Dade County Airport (1945-1955)
 Was:  Homestead Air Force Base (1955-1994)
 Now:  Homestead Air Reserve Base (1994-Present) 
 Miami Army Airfield (36th Street Airport), Miami
 Joint Civil/Army Airfield use
 Also used by: Army Air Forces Antisubmarine Command
 HQ 45th Bombardment Group (I Bomber Command) (1942)
 HQ 26th Antisubmarine Wing (1942-1943)
 Army Air Forces Pilot School (Miscellaneous Fields)
 Operated by Pan American Airways
 Later: : 408th Army Air Force Base Unit (Contract pilot training)
 1595th Army Air Force Base Unit (First Foreign Transport Group)
 1105th Army Air Force Base Unit (ATC Caribbean Wing)
 Now: Miami International Airport 

 Initially used by: 8th Pursuit Wing, III Interceptor Command
 Also used by: Army Air Forces Antisubmarine Command
 26th Antisubmarine Wing (Squadrons)
 HQ Caribbean Wing, ATC
 427th Army Air Force Base Unit
 Also used by: United States Navy
 Later:  Palm Beach Air Force Base (1951-1962)
 Now: Palm Beach International Airport

Proving Ground Command

 HQ Army Air Forces Proving Ground Command
 Known sub-bases and auxiliaries

 Eglin Air Force Auxiliary Field #1
 Now  Eglin AFB Aux Fld #1, Wagner Field
 Eglin Air Force Auxiliary Field #2
 Now:  Eglin AFB Aux Fld #2 Pierce Field
 Eglin Air Force Auxiliary Field #3
 Now:  Eglin AFB Aux Fld #3, Duke Field
 Eglin Air Force Auxiliary Field #4
 Now:  Eglin AFB Aux Fld #4, Peel Field
 Eglin Air Force Auxiliary Field #5
 Now:  Eglin AFB Aux Fld #5, Piccolo Field
 Eglin Air Force Auxiliary Field #6
 Now:  Eglin AFB Aux Fld #6 Biancur Field and Camp Rudder (1 October 1958-Present)

 Eglin Air Force Auxiliary Field #7
 Now:  Eglin AFB Aux Fld #7, Epler Field
 Eglin Air Force Auxiliary Field #8
 Now:  Eglin AFB Auf Fld #8, Baldsiefen Field
 Eglin Air Force Auxiliary Field #9
 Previously Eglin AFB Aux Fld #9, Hurlburt Field (1947-1955)
 Now:  Hurlburt Field
 Eglin Air Force Auxiliary Field #10 (Dillon Field) (1943)
 Now:  Naval Outlying Landing Field Choctaw (United States Navy)
 Santa Rosa Island Range Complex
 Now:  Santa Rosa Island Range Complex

 Now:  Eglin Air Force Base

Minor Airfields

 Used by: Army Air Forces Antisubmarine Command (1942-1943)
 26th Antisubmarine Wing (Squadrons)
 Now:  Naval Air Station Key West 
 Used by: Army Air Forces Antisubmarine Command (1942-1943)
 26th Antisubmarine Wing (Squadrons)
 Now: Florida Keys Marathon Airport 
 Used by: Army Air Forces Antisubmarine Command (1942-1943)
 26th Antisubmarine Wing (Squadrons)
 Now: Key West International Airport 
 Used by: Army Air Forces Antisubmarine Command (1942-1943)
 26th Antisubmarine Wing (Squadrons)
 Now: Palm Beach County Park Airport 

 Flagler Beach Airport, Flagler Beach
 Civil Air Patrol Use
 Used by: Army Air Forces Antisubmarine Command (1942-1943)
 26th Antisubmarine Wing (Squadrons)
 Closed appx. 1945, now abandoned
 Likely Emergency landing airfield
 Closed appx. 1950, now farmland
 Likely Emergency landing airfield
 Now: Pomona Landing Airport  
 Likely Emergency landing airfield
 Now: Quincy Municipal Airport 
 Used by the Dugway Proving Ground Mobile Chemical Warfare Testing Unit
 Now: Closed appx. 1945, now abandoned

References

 Maurer, Maurer (1983). Air Force Combat Units Of World War II. Maxwell AFB, Alabama: Office of Air Force History. .
 Ravenstein, Charles A. (1984). Air Force Combat Wings Lineage and Honors Histories 1947-1977. Maxwell AFB, Alabama: Office of Air Force History. .
 Thole, Lou (1999), Forgotten Fields of America : World War II Bases and Training, Then and Now - Vol. 2.  Pictorial Histories Pub . 
 Military Airfields in World War II - Florida

External links

 
World War II
United States World War II army airfields
World War II Army Airfields
World War II Army Airfields
.